There are at least 42 named lakes and reservoirs in Lonoke County, Arkansas.

Lakes
	Bearskin Lake, el.  
	Belcher Lake, el.  
	Buffalo Slough, el.  
	Clear Lake, el.  
	Coburn Brake, el.  
	Cooper Lake, el.  
	Dry Bayou, el.  
	Jarvis Lake, el.  
	Johnson Lake, el.  
	Jordan Brake, el.  
	Mound Pond, el.  
	Salt Lake, el.  
	Sheaffer Lake, el.  
	Shuffield Lake, el.  
	Swan Lake, el.  
	White Lake, el.  
	Young's Pond, el.

Reservoirs
	Burlesons Pond, el.  
	Catfish Lake, el.  
	Cooper Lake, el.  
	Davis Lake, el.  
	Indian Head Lake, el.  
	Indian Head Lake - South, el.  
	John Thompson Lake, el.  
	Keller Lake, el.  
	Lake Lemay, el.  
	Little Pond, el.  
	McCallie - North Lake, el.  
	McCallie - South Reservoir, el.  
	Mintons Lake, el.  
	Mound Lake, el.  
	Omni Lake, el.  
	Omni Lake Number Two, el.  
	Parker Lake, el.  
	Peterson Lake, el.  
	Pickthorne Lake, el.  
	Reservoir Number One, el.  
	Richmond Pond, el.  
	Rick Lake, el.  
	Sniders Pond, el.  
	Taton Lake, el.  
	Willow Lake, el.

See also

 List of lakes in Arkansas

Notes

Bodies of water of Lonoke County, Arkansas
Lonoke